Heritage Park is a community park in Taylor, Michigan located at 12111 Pardee Road. Many know it as "The Jewel of the City". The park offers baseball diamonds, soccer fields, historical buildings, a public library, and many more events for the public to enjoy. Families gather at Heritage Park to engage in activities with the family outside of the home. Free walking tours, which include descriptions of the origins of each historical building located on-site are available upon request.

History
There are various buildings and bridges throughout Heritage Park that have an underlying meaning. The West Mound Church  located inside of the park was built in the 1880s by German settlers that immigrated to Taylor. Couples still get married in this church or even renew their vows. There was an old train station located in Taylor until it went up in flames in the 1960s. Taylor students made an exact replica to be used as a shop in the park.

Events
There are many events held at the park throughout the year. A lot of sporting events take place such as soccer games, baseball games, tennis, even mud volleyball tournaments. Every summer local bands and even known artists visit the city to play concerts during the Taylor festivities. Heritage Park is known for holding events such as Taylor Summer Festival, Hallow-Palooza, Winterfest, and the Junior League World Series.

Junior League World Series

Heritage Park is home to the Junior League World Series founded in 1981. This is an event in which 13- and 14-year-old boys from all over the world come to play for the first-place trophy. The JLWS is usually held in the month of August and lasts for about a week. Young boys and their families come from Europe, the Middle East, Africa, Latin America, the Asia-Pacific region, Canada, and the United States. Over 200 Taylor residents volunteer their time and money each year to help out during the games.

References

Junior League Baseball

External links

 Official website

Parks in Michigan
Sports venues in Michigan
Protected areas of Wayne County, Michigan
Taylor, Michigan